Dimitrios Stamatis (alternate spelling: Dimitris) (born January 12, 1996) is a Greek professional basketball player for Mykonos of the Greek 3rd division. He is 1.88 m (6'2") tall. He can play at both the point guard and shooting guard positions. His father, Antonios Stamatis, was also a professional basketball player.

Professional career
In 2012, Stamatis played at the Jordan Brand Classic International game. After playing basketball with the youth teams of AGOG Evriali, Stamatis began his pro career in 2013, with the Greek League club Panionios. In November 2015, Stamatis joined Nea Kifissia of the Greek Basket League.

In August 2016, he joined Kymis. He moved to the Greek club Kolossos Rhodes in 2017. He joined Ifaistos Limnou in 2018. Stamatis averaged 4.6 points per game during the 2019–20 season. He signed with Aris Thessaloniki of the Greek Basket League on September 24, 2020. 

On November 4, 2021, Stamatis signed with Iraklis. In 18 games, he averaged 6.9 points, 1.6 rebounds and 2.5 assists, playing around 24 minutes per contest.

National team career
Stamatis was a member of the Greek junior national teams. With the junior national teams of Greece, he played at some of the following tournaments: the 2011 FIBA Europe Under-16 Championship, the 2012 FIBA Europe Under-16 Championship, the 2013 FIBA Europe Under-18 Championship, the 2014 FIBA Europe Under-18 Championship. He also played at the 2015 FIBA Under-19 World Cup, the 2015 FIBA Europe Under-20 Championship, and the 2nd division 2016 FIBA Europe Under-20 Championship Division B, where he won a bronze medal.

References

External links
EuroCup Profile
FIBA Profile
FIBA Europe Profile
Eurobasket.com Profile
Greek Basket League Profile 
Hellenic Federation Profile 
NBADraft.net Profile
Draftexpress.com Profile

1996 births
Living people
Greek men's basketball players
Aris B.C. players
Iraklis Thessaloniki B.C. players
Ifaistos Limnou B.C. players
Kymis B.C. players
Nea Kifissia B.C. players
Panionios B.C. players
Point guards
Shooting guards
Basketball players from Athens